
This is a list of buildings and nonbuilding structures in Portugal with a confirmed minimum height of 100 m (328 ft).

References

External links 
 http://skyscraperpage.com/diagrams/?searchID=37735342
 http://www.ead.eurocontrol.int/eadbasic/pamslight/B5N5XI3TOPDWY/EN/AIP/ENR/LP_ENR_5_4_en_2010-11-18.pdf

Tallest
Portugal